Karnkowo  is a village in the administrative district of Gmina Lipno, within Lipno County, Kuyavian-Pomeranian Voivodeship, in north-central Poland. It is located in the historic Dobrzyń Land.

History
During the German occupation of Poland (World War II), the forest of Karnkowo was the site of large massacres, in which Germans murdered around 200 Poles, inhabitants of Karnkowo, as well as nearby towns of Lipno and Skępe and other nearby villages. Local teacher Władysław Karczewski was among Polish teachers murdered in the Mauthausen concentration camp during the Intelligenzaktion.

Notable people
 Stanisław Karnkowski (1520–1603), archbishop of Gniezno and Primate of Poland, bishop of Kuyavia, royal secretary of Polish kings, interrex in 1586–1587
  (1894–1940), Polish military officer, Katyn massacre victim

References

Villages in Lipno County
Nazi war crimes in Poland